Guides Pol or Pol's Guides (est.1896) was a series of travel guide books to France and Switzerland.  oversaw the enterprise.

References

Further reading
  circa 1918
 
 
 
 
 
 
 
  circa 1900s
 
 
 
  circa 1907

External links
 Virtual International Authority File. Toursier, Gustave, 1869-1950

Travel guide books
Series of books
Publications established in 1896
Books about France
Tourism in France